Vineland may refer to:
 Vinland, the Viking colony in North America
 Vineland, a novel by Thomas Pynchon

Placenames

Canada
 Vineland, Ontario

United States
 Vineland, Alabama
 Vineland, Colorado
 Vineland, Florida
 Apopka-Vineland Road, several roads in Orange County, Florida
 Vineland, Minnesota
 Vineland Township, Polk County, Minnesota
 Vineland, Missouri
 Vineland, New Jersey
 Vineland Senior High School North, a public high school
 Vineland Senior High School South, a public high school
 Clarkston Heights-Vineland, Washington